Ngazobil (also called Ngasobil) is a village in Senegal, located on the Petite Côte, south of Dakar.

History
Since the 19th century, Ngazobil has housed a Catholic mission, one of the oldest in Senegal, established by François Libermann of Saverne, founder of the Congregation of The Holy Spirit.

Louis-Philippe Walter stayed there in 1867.

It was also in Ngazobil that future president Léopold Sédar Senghor did his schooling until 1922.

Hyacinthe Thiandoum was trained there as well.

Saint-Joseph Seminary was classified as a historical monument in 2003.

Ngazobil is now a common site for pilgrimages.

Administration
Ngazobil is located in M'bour, Thiès.

Geography
The nearest towns are Pointe-Sarène, Ponto, Mbodiène, Joal-Fadiouth, Palmarin, and Djifer.

The scenery of the village includes a limestone cliff, a sandy beach, and a 500-hectare forest park. The park shelters many animals, including guineafowl, partridges, boas, monitor lizards, monkeys, hedgehogs, porcupines, jackals, and hares.

The Catholic mission itself owns a beach lined with coconut palm trees where some come to fish.

Bibliography

References

External links
Maps, weather and airports for Ngazobil
 Ngazobil on the Joal-Fadiouth official website

Populated places in Thiès Region